John Brunne or Brun (died c. 1405), of Willingham, Cambridgeshire, was an English politician. He was a Member (MP) of the Parliament of England for Cambridgeshire in January 1404.

References

14th-century births
1405 deaths
People from South Cambridgeshire District
English MPs January 1404